İlxıçı or Ilxıçı or Ilkhychi or Ilkhychy may refer to:
İlxıçı, Agsu, Azerbaijan
İlxıçı, Khachmaz, Azerbaijan
İlxıçı, Sayad, Khachmaz Rayon, Azerbaijan